Statistics of Football League First Division in the 1964-65 season.

Overview
Manchester United won the First Division title for the sixth time in the club's history that season, ahead of newly-promoted Leeds United after Leeds drew their final game of the season (3-3) against already relegated Birmingham City; whilst Manchester United, with still one further game to play, beat Arsenal 3-1 at Old Trafford, the celebratory third goal coming from Denis Law. With both Leeds and Manchester United level on 61 points, and in those days in such an event, the title being decided on goal average, Manchester United enjoyed such a superior goal average to render their final league game of the season (a 2-1 defeat away to Aston Villa) as all but irrelevant.

League standings

Results

Top scorers

References

RSSSF

Football League First Division seasons
Eng
1964–65 Football League
1964–65 in English football leagues

lt:Anglijos futbolo varžybos 1964–1965 m.
hu:1964–1965-es angol labdarúgó-bajnokság (első osztály)
ru:Футбольная лига Англии 1964-1965